Greg Bearman (born August 2, 1975) is a former professional Canadian football defensive back. In the 2006 CFL season, he was selected 25th overall by the Hamilton Tiger-Cats in the Renegades' dispersal draft. but signed as a free-agent with the Blue Bombers on July 11.

References

External links
 Winnipeg Blue Bombers biography

1975 births
Living people
People from Richmond, British Columbia
BC Lions players
Ottawa Renegades players
Hamilton Tiger-Cats players
Winnipeg Blue Bombers players